

The Weybridge Man Powered Aircraft (also known as Dumbo and later Mercury) is a British single-seat man-powered aircraft built and flown by members of the Weybridge Man Powered Aircraft Group.

Development
The Weybridge Man Powered Aircraft Group was formed in late 1967 with members drawn from the British Aircraft Corporation factory and the local chapter of the Royal Aeronautical Society. Construction started in 1968 and the aircraft was assembled at Wisley and flown for the first time from Weybridge on 18 September 1971. The Weybridge MPA (which was named Dumbo) was flown by Christopher Lovell for a distance of 46 metres with a height reached of 3 ft (0.9m). Only two flights were made at Weybridge and the aircraft was passed to another group at RAF Cranwell who renamed it Mercury.

Design
The aircraft is a low-wing cantilever monoplane with a fuselage made from aluminium alloy tubing with balsa frames and covered with Melinex. The wing has a single warren-girder main spar of aluminium alloy tubing with balsa ribs and, like the fuselage, covered with Melinex. The landing gear was a non-retractable tandem arrangement using bicycle wheels. The power is generated by the pilot in an enclosed cockpit using bicycle pedals driving a two-bladed balsa pusher propeller.

Specifications

See also

References

Notes

Bibliography

Aircraft first flown in 1971
1970s British experimental aircraft
Human-powered aircraft
Single-engined pusher aircraft
Low-wing aircraft